Myanmar had a total primary energy supply (TPES) of 16.57 Mtoe in 2013. Electricity consumption was 8.71 TWh. 65% of the primary energy supply consists of biomass energy, used almost exclusively (97%) in the residential sector. Myanmar’s energy consumption per capita is one of the lowest in Southeast Asia due to the low electrification rate and a widespread poverty. An estimated 65% of the population is not connected to the national grid. Energy consumption is growing rapidly, however, with an average annual growth rate of 3.3% from 2000 to 2007.

Most of Myanmar's electricity (74.7%) is produced by hydroelectricity. The rest is from fossil fuels, with gas as the main fuel (20.5%) followed by coal and oil. In 2017, Myanmar had an installed electricity generation capacity of about 5 gigawatts (GW). The country plans to achieve 100% electrification by 2030. The country is targeting 12% of all electricity to be generated from renewable sources by 2025.

The total installed capacity of Myanmar at May 2020 is 6034 MW: 3262 MW of hydro power (54%), 2496 MW of natural gas (41%), 120 MW of coal (2%), 116 MW of diesel (2%) and 40 MW of solar (1%). The cost of electricity production was revealed to be 12 kyats per Kwh for government owned hydro power plants, 72 kyats per Kwh for private owned hydropower plants, 150 to 190 kyats for natural gas plants and 195 kyats for solar power plants.  At the Myanmar Oil and Gas Society annual meeting on 24 January 2021, minister U Win Khaing mentioned that the country is realigning to new energy mix to hydropower 40%, solar 14%, domestic gas 34% and LNG 11%. This will bring the make the renewable energy composition to 54% and clean fuel (natural gas) composition to 45% of total installed capacity of 8,118 megawatts (MW).

The electrification rate in Myanmar is one of the lowest in Asia, at 50% in 2019 December. The electrification rate is especially low in rural villages, which are mainly not connected to the power grid. Wood and biomass are used as a primary source of energy in these areas.

Myanmar has abundant energy resources, particularly hydropower and natural gas. In 2013, Myanmar exported 8561 ktoe of natural gas and 144 ktoe of crude oil. The country is one of the five major energy exporters in the region and is the second biggest exporter of natural gas in the Asia Pacific region after Indonesia. According to the World Energy Council, gas reserves are estimated at 244 Mtoe. Oil and coal play a smaller role with reserves estimated at 7 and 1 Mtoe, respectively.

The energy sector is considered a strategic industry by the Myanmar government and the petroleum sector is one of the biggest recipients of foreign direct investment.

Hydropower 
Hydropower resources are estimated to be about 40 GW at a capacity factor of 0.40, giving a total yearly hydropower generation capacity of about 140 TWh. Installed hydropower capacity as of 2011 was 1.54 GW with a total generation of 3.9 TWh, there is, therefore, a substantial opportunity for further growth of this energy source.

The Shweli 1 hydroelectric power plant, with a capacity of 600 megawatts (MW), started operation in 2008. The Yeywa hydropower plant opened in 2010 with a capacity of 790 MW, the largest in the country. Several other hydropower projects are under construction or planned. Planned major hydropower plants have been designed mainly for export. The Myitsone Dam project, with a capacity of 6,000 MW, is expected to supply 100% of its electricity to China, while the Tasang Dam project with a planned capacity of 7,110 MW is planned to supply 1,500 MW to Thailand.

Solar energy 
Developing solar energy in Myanmar is viewed as an important climate change mitigation measure for the country that is highly vulnerable to the detrimental impacts of climate change.

Myanmar has one solar power plant operating in Minbu, Magway Division. The plant has the capacity to produce 170 MW of electricity. The country plans to build two more solar power plants Mandalay Division, each to have a generation capacity of 150 MW. Energy subsidies for electricity and lacking tax policy, lack of qualified workforce and limited public administration capacity are viewed to be among the main obstacles complicating development of solar energy in Myanmar. Another study identified three major barriers to promoting solar energy in Myanmar: weak renewable energy governance, lacking clear regulatory mechanisms, and the complicated investment climate for international investors.

On 18 May 2020, Ministry of Electricity and Energy issued an invitation to submit prequalifying bids for the construction of several solar plants throughout the country, with a combined capacity of 1060 MW. The ministry received more than 150 bids for the tenders and on 9 September 2020 bidders were announced. All but one of the winning bids for the 30 sites involved Chinese companies, with unit price ranging from 3.48 US cents to 5.1 cents per kilowatt hour.

Wind energy 
Myanmar's Department of Renewable Energy and Hydropower Plants is prioritising the development of solar and wind energy. Rakhine State, Tanintharyi and Ayeyarwaddy regions have been identified as sites with strong wind power potential. However, solar energy potential is higher compared to that of wind energy in Myanmar.

Myanmar is developing its first wind power plant in Chaung Thar, Ayeyarwaddy Region, through a 30 MW wind power project it is undertaking with China's Three Gorges Corporation.

See also
Solar power in Myanmar
Oil and gas industry in Myanmar

References